An alabastron  or alabastrum  (plural: alabastra or alabastrons; from the Greek ) is a small type of pottery or glass vessel used for holding oil, especially perfume or massage oils. They originated around the 11th century BC in ancient Egypt as containers carved from alabaster – hence the name – and spread via ancient Greece to other parts of the classical world.

Most types of alabastron have a narrow body with a rounded end, a narrow neck and a broad, splayed mouth. They were often left without handles, but some types were equipped with ear-shaped projections or lugs into which holes were punched. Strings were then put through these holes for easy mobility.

The design of the first Egyptian alabastra was inspired by the palm tree, with a columnar shape, a palm capital and a stand. Later designs were made from glass decorated with various patterns, such as scallops, festoons or abstract patterns of rings or zigzags.

Around the 7th century BC, alabastra spread to Greece and became an important element of ancient Greek pottery. There were three distinct types of Greek alabastron:

 A long and pointed version commonly seen in eastern Greek, Etruscan, and Italo-Corinthian pottery.

Alabastra also appeared in many other places in the ancient world, notably Assyria, Syria and Palestine, all having presumably been inspired by or exported from Greece or Egypt.

The decoration usually involved dividing the body of the vase into four horizontal zones by ornamental bands around it.

See also

 Ancient Greek vase painting
 Pottery of ancient Greece

References

Bibliography

 "Alabastron." Encyclopædia Britannica. 2006

Ancient Greek pot shapes
Perfumery
Massage
Ancient Roman glassware
Alabaster